Princess Augusta Wilhelmina of Hesse-Darmstadt (14 April 1765 – 30 March 1796) was Duchess consort of Zweibrücken by marriage to Maximilian, Duke of Zweibrücken and the mother of King Ludwig I of Bavaria.

Biography
Augusta Wilhelmina was born at Darmstadt, the fourth daughter and ninth child of Prince George William of Hesse-Darmstadt (second son of Louis VIII, Landgrave of Hesse-Darmstadt) and Countess Maria Louise Albertine of Leiningen-Falkenburg-Dagsburg.

Marriage

On 30 September 1785, in Darmstadt, Augusta Wilhelmina married Maximilian, Count Palatine of Zweibrücken (later King Maximilian I Joseph of Bavaria). 

Maximilian was an officer in the French army stationed at Strasbourg, but the couple also often visited Paris. There, Augusta Wilhelmina met Queen Marie Antoinette, with whom she maintained an ongoing correspondence.

In 1789, Maximilian's regiment rose in revolt and he and Augusta Wilhelmina fled to her parents' home in Darmstadt. For the next five years, they lived mostly in the neighboring town of Mannheim. In December 1794, the French army attacked Mannheim. Augusta Wilhelmina fled the city when her home was shelled by French artillery.

Duchess of Zweibrücken
In April 1795, Maximilian succeeded his brother as reigning Duke of Zweibrücken; however, his duchy was entirely occupied by the French. Her death plunged Maximilian into deep mourning. He wrote some poems in memory of his wife. She was buried in the Schlosskirche in Darmstadt.

Issue
Augusta Wilhelmina had five children:

 Prince Ludwig (1786–1868), married Therese of Saxe-Hildburghausen.
 Princess Augusta Amalia Ludovika, (21 June 1788 – 13 May 1851), married Eugène de Beauharnais, Duke of Leuchtenberg, Prince of Eichstätt.
 Princess Amalia Maria Augusta (9 October 1790 – 24 January 1794), died in childhood.
 Princess Caroline Augusta (8 February 1792 – 9 February 1873), married William I of Württemberg, and then Francis II of Austria.
 Prince Karl Theodor Maximilian (7 July 1795 – 16 August 1875).

Ancestry

Footnotes

Bibliography

Winkler, Wilhelm. "Die Mutter König Ludwig I. von Bayern nach ungedruckten Briefen", Die Wächter (1924).

1765 births
1796 deaths
House of Hesse-Darmstadt
House of Wittelsbach
Nobility from Darmstadt
18th-century deaths from tuberculosis
Tuberculosis deaths in Germany